The 1989 FIBA Under-19 World Championship for Women (Spanish: 1989 Campeonato Mundial FIBA Sub-19 Femenino) took place in Spain from 23 to 30 July 1989. It was co-organised by the International Basketball Federation (FIBA) and Spanish Basketball Federation.

Twelve national teams competed for the championship. Soviet Union came away with the Gold medal by defeating Yugoslavia 109-93 in the final.

Venues
Bilbao

Competing nations

Except Spain, which automatically qualified as the host nation, the 11 remaining countries qualified through their continents’ qualifying tournaments:

FIBA Africa (1)
 
FIBA Asia (2)
 
 

FIBA Americas (3)
 
 
 
FIBA Oceania (1)
 

FIBA Europe (5)
  (Host)

Final standings

Awards

References

External links
 Official Web of 1989 FIBA World Championship for Junior Women.

1989
1989–90 in Spanish basketball
1989 in women's basketball
International women's basketball competitions hosted by Spain